is a former Japanese football player.

Club statistics

References

External links

j-league

1982 births
Living people
University of Teacher Education Fukuoka alumni
Association football people from Fukuoka Prefecture
Japanese footballers
J2 League players
Japan Football League players
Sagawa Shiga FC players
Fagiano Okayama players
Association football goalkeepers